Jacqueline Beaujeu-Garnier (1 May 1917 – 28 April 1995) was a French geographer.
She was president of the Société de Géographie from 1983 to 1995 and led the scientific publication L'Information géographique. With Philippe Pinchemel she founded the geographical periodical Hommes et Terres du Nord in 1963.

Life 
From 1960 to 1986, she was a professor at the Sorbonne University.

Publications  
 Le Morvan et sa bordure : étude morphologique (thèse principale), 1947, publiée aux PUF en 1950.
 La Région du Brenner (thèse complémentaire), 1947
 L'Économie de l'Amérique latine, PUF, 1949. (nombreuses rééditions mises à jour)
 Trois milliards d'hommes : traité de démo-géographie, Hachette, 1965 (réédité en 1969).
 L'homme et la ville dans le monde actuel, Desclée de Brouwer, 1969.
 Europe et Amérique, Génin, 1969.
 Géographie de la population, 2 volumes, Génin, 1969–1973.
 Traité de géographie urbaine, with Georges Chabot, A. Colin, 1970.
 Les États-Unis : géographie humaine, Centre de documentation universitaire, 1970.
 La géographie : méthodes et perspectives, Masson et Cie, 1971.
 Paris et la région parisienne : atlas pour tous, with Jean Bastié, Berger-Levrault, 1972.
  France, Londres/New York, Longman, 1975.
 ''Atlas et géographie de Paris & la region d'Ile de France

References

Further reading 
 
 

People from Haute-Loire
1917 births
1995 deaths
French geographers
Chevaliers of the Légion d'honneur
Commanders of the Ordre national du Mérite
Urban geographers
Winners of the Prix Broquette-Gonin (literature)
Women geographers
20th-century geographers